Riverdale Local School is a public K–12 school located near Mount Blanchard in Delaware Township, Hancock County, Ohio, United States.  The school system is the result of a consolidation of three school districts.  The communities of Forest (in Hardin County), Wharton (in Wyandot County) and Mount Blanchard (in Hancock County) comprise the school district which consolidated in 1962.  It is the only school in the Riverdale Local Schools district.  Their building, opened in 2005, currently houses grades K-12, while the original high school building still stands on campus to act as a centralized office for records, a head start program as well as other school functions.

History 
Prior to the consolidation in 1962, the villages of Forest, Wharton and Mt. Blanchard had their own individual K-12 school buildings. With the consolidation, the system was set in place where elementary aged children would attend the Mt. Blanchard and Forest schools, combine to form a middle school in the Wharton building, then finally move together to the then newly built "Riverdale High School" building, located on rural land in between the three towns.

While in existence, the three original schools retained their original mascots (Forest Rangers, Mt. Blanchard Hurricanes, Wharton Dragons), fight songs and alma maters. To eliminate arguments as to which of these to keep for the newly established high school, then music teacher Russell E. Willeke was asked to pen new, contemporary songs. His original composition and lyrics remain the student body's official fight song to this day.

As well as his original alma mater, even though its lyrics are often contested due to the line "our spirit never die" seemingly being grammatically incorrect. It is believed that Willeke did this to not only establish the student body as one entity with the singular "spirit", but also to maintain the rhyming pattern with a singular "die" in order to rhyme with "high". The lyrics are taken from Willeke's original, handwritten lyrics preserved in the school's music department.

Athletics
Riverdale's mascot is the Falcon. The school's mascot, Freddie Falcon, has fallen out of use over the years. While the athletic department has attempted to bring back the character as recent as the Fall 2018 football season, it has yet to be officially recognized as the school's official falcon character. Their school colors are Riverdale's own shade of royal blue (commonly referred to as "Falcon blue")  and white  with trims of silver  used to accent uniforms and logos. The Riverdale student body considers their sports rival to by Liberty-Benton High School, although their traditional rival is Arlington High School, located just 15 minutes from their campus. Their current property possesses a track, two baseball diamonds, pond, two football fields (one for games, one for practice and JV), two soccer fields (one for games, one for soccer and marching band practice) and a greenhouse.

Riverdale was previously a co-founding member of the North Central Conference (NCC) from 1962 until joining the Blanchard Valley Conference (BVC) in 2014. Riverdale was originally part of a group of ten schools that were going to form the Northern 10 Athletic Conference (N10) in 2014–15, ultimately causing the dissolution of the North Central Conference.  However, in April 2013, Riverdale was invited to join the BVC, which is primarily made up of other schools located in Hancock County.  Riverdale accepted the invitation and could possibly join the BVC before the N10 begins athletic competition.

Incidents
In May 2014, a security video showing a Riverdale kindergarten teacher aggressively lifting one of her students against a wall by his shirt and neck received international headlines. The video was discovered after several lunchroom workers overheard the debacle whilst on their break and reported the situation to administration. After receiving a ten-day suspension and receiving a misdemeanor charge, the teacher resigned. The story made it to newspapers and news broadcasts around the world, being covered by American broadcasts such as NBC, and even being commented on by legal commentator and television journalist Nancy Grace. While the Riverdale administration and student body have openly stated that they do not condone any treatment of this nature, many students at the time donned shirts inscribed with #BringBarbBack, showing support for the teacher, whom some believed to have been "pushed to her limit" by the child.

In March 2017, a junior returned to Riverdale after attending his morning classes at Findlay's vocational school, Millstream Career Center, with a Confederate flag or "rebel" flag on the back of his pickup truck. Upon his arrival, then assistant principal Jeffrey A. Young greeted the student, and gave him the offer to either remove the controversial banner from his vehicle, or leave the grounds. The student chose to leave. The school's administration explained their stance to The Courier that evening - that they see the flag as a symbol of "a slave nation and racial division". The student, however, saw the flag as a symbol of heritage and  "began flying the flag from his truck now because the Civil War broke out in March," although it was pointed out by The Courier the war's first battle, Fort Sumter, occurred in April 1861. The Riverdale administration later noted that thought the "timing might not be coincidental", as the school's basketball team was to hold a game against a school with 100% minority enrollment, Columbus Africentric, that very evening of the incident. The day the story was published, many students were sent home for wearing their "rebel flag" apparel to Riverdale, while other students decided to post a letter addressed to those sporting the apparel on the student activities board in the high school hallway, explaining their objection to the symbol.

In June 2017, a fifth grade special education teacher was charged with three counts of sexual battery (all third-degree felonies) for sexually assaulting a 13-year-old female student. The incident did not take place on school grounds, and the student was not in the teacher's class, but rather one of the after school activities she was overseeing. Reported by the victim's parents, the incidences occurred on January 4 and February 3.  Her resignation was received by Riverdale on March 27. After the accusations were made and the teacher was taken to court, she was found guilty for one count of sexual battery, resulting in a three-year prison sentence. The other two counts were dropped.

Notes and references

External links
 District Website

High schools in Hancock County, Ohio
Public high schools in Ohio
School districts established in 1962